Hendrik Jan (Henk Jan) Ormel (born 15 December 1955 in Utrecht) is a  former Dutch politician. As a member of the Christian Democratic Appeal (Christen-Democratisch Appèl) he was an MP from 23 May 2002 to 19 September 2012. He focused on matters of foreign policy, the European Union, biotechnology and animal welfare. Henk Jan Ormel also sits on the Executive Committee of AWEPA.

Decorations 
 In 2012 he was awarded Knight of the Order of Orange-Nassau.

References 
  Parlement.com biography

External links 
  Personal website
 http://www.awepa.org/about-us/organisational-structure/executive-committee/

1955 births
Living people
Christian Democratic Appeal politicians
Knights of the Order of Orange-Nassau
Members of the House of Representatives (Netherlands)
Politicians from Utrecht (city)
21st-century Dutch politicians